Al Pearlman was a Democratic member of Philadelphia City Council.  He served two non-consecutive terms.  He resigned from his first term (1976–1982) to unsuccessfully run for state senate.   His second term began in 1984. Dying of cancer, he committed suicide in 1984.

He was also a contractor and built  Frank Rizzo's house in Philadelphia.

He inspired the grassroots political group Anti-Pearlman Permanent Poster League, or APPPLE.

References

1984 suicides
American politicians who committed suicide
Year of birth missing
Philadelphia City Council members